Nelson is an unincorporated historic locale in Baker County, Oregon, United States.

A cement plant built in Nelson in 1979 replaced the one at Lime, which closed in 1980. The cement plant at Nelson closed temporarily in 2009, but as of 2014 it was operating again. The Ash Grove Cement Company refers to the plant as their Durkee plant.

Nelson is located on the Union Pacific Railroad mainline's Huntington Subdivision. The subdivision was originally owned by the Oregon Railway & Navigation Company. The tracks were built here from 1882 to 1884.

References

External links
Images of Nelson from Flickr

Former populated places in Baker County, Oregon